Ingrid Bisu (born 15 September 1987) is a Romanian actress, producer, and screenwriter, known for her appearance in the dramedy Toni Erdmann (2016), which was nominated at The Cannes Film Festival for the Palme d'Or  and also for Best Foreign Film at the Golden Globe Awards and the Academy Awards in 2017. She is also known for co-writing the horror film Malignant (2021).

Early life and family
Bisu was born on 15 September 1987 in Bucharest to Romanian-German parents. She grew up in the German community in Romania, attending the German kindergarten, high school, and college in Bucharest.

In 2003 at the age of 16, Bisu had her first photoshoot in the teenage magazine "Cool Girl" and then landed her first commercial for Orange S.A. Mobile, which was broadcast in Israel and Romania.

Career

Early career
Bisu made her debut in a Romanian TV series Casatorie de Proba (Marriage of Probation) Following this, she was featured in a number of Romanian magazines and television interviews. Bisu had a role in the movie BloodRayne where she acted alongside Ben Kingsley, and had other smaller roles in sitcoms such as La Bloc(In The Building) and Arestat la domiciliu (House Arrested) with Pro TV.

In 2006, Bisu played the lead role of Alice in the drama television movie O Lume A Durerii (A World of Pain), which showed the struggles of teenage women in Romania at the time. Her performance gained the attention of director Cristian Mungiu, winner of the Palme d’Or at the Cannes Film Festival in 2007 for his movie 4 Months, 3 Weeks and 2 Days. He cast Bisu as Viviana for his series Tales from the Golden Age. The series was nominated six times at the Cannes Film Festival. In 2007, Bisu enrolled in the Hyperion Academy of Dramatic Arts in Bucharest. During this time she appeared as Naomi in the drama series 17, Poveste despre destin (2008) on Prima TV, and as Bianca in the comedy series Nimeni nu-i perfect (Nobody's Perfect),

Further success
After roles in the horror film Slaughter and the Christmas comedy Ho Ho Ho, Bisu played the part of Mona/Amie 2 in the movie What War May Bring, directed by Claude Lelouch. She then appeared in the film Portrait of the Fighter as a Young Man, directed by Constantin Popescu, where she played the real-life figure Matilda Jubleanu.

In 2011, Bisu worked with Cristian Mungiu in Outbound. The film earned 19 awards and nine nominations at international film festivals, including the Locarno International Film Festival, Viennale. The same year, she became one of the youngest television presenters, for her work as host and producer on the national morning show on Kanal D Romania. Cafeaua de dimineata (Morning Coffee), was a two-hour live morning news program. During every show, she would teach people how to do something themselves or show activities they could try.

In 2012, Bisu was featured in Romanian films such as Sunt o babă comunistă, directed by Stere Gulea, and Roxanne, directed by Vali Hotea. both films with multiple nominations. She played a supporting role as Minerva in the American horror movie Dracula: The Dark Prince in 2013 starring Jon Voight. The same year, she was featured in the science fiction film The Zero Theorem, directed by Terry Gilliam, with Matt Damon and Christoph Waltz. In 2014, she played Brittany White, the host of a five-hour live comedy web series, being broadcast in the United States, called The Super Yolo Sho.

International crossover
In 2016, Bisu appeared in Toni Erdmann as Anca, the assistant of the lead character played by Sandra Hüller. Directed by Maren Ade, the film received over 56 nominations and 33 award wins, including Best Film and Best Screenplay, with Maren Ade named Best Director and actors Sandra Hüller and Peter Simonischek Best Actress and Best Actor at the 2016 European Film Awards. It was also nominated for the Palme d'Or at the Cannes Film Festival where it won the FIPRESCI award. It was nominated for Best Foreign Film at the 2017 Golden Globes and the 2016 Academy Awards. Bisu's performance was singled out for praise by A.O. Scott in his review for The New York Times.

Bisu then co-starred in the horror film The Nun, a spinoff of The Conjuring 2, playing Sister Oana: she met future husband James Wan on set. The film was released in September 2018. In 2021 she co-wrote, executive produced and had a supporting role in Malignant, her first joint creative and behind the scenes project with husband James Wan.

Filmography

Film

Television

Personal life
On June 22, 2019, Bisu became engaged to Australian director James Wan. They married in November 2019.

References

External links
 

1987 births
Living people
Actresses from Bucharest
Romanian people of German descent
Romanian emigrants to the United States
21st-century Romanian actresses